"In Your Room" is the fourth and final single released from English electronic music band Depeche Mode's eighth studio album, Songs of Faith and Devotion (1993). Released on 10 January 1994, the song reached number eight on the UK Singles Chart and peaked at number two in Denmark, Finland, and Sweden. It is the last single to feature Alan Wilder as a member before his departure in 1995.

Song details
The version of "In Your Room" used for the single release is the "Zephyr" mix, which is radically different from the original album version, being nearly completely redone by Butch Vig of the band Garbage. Additional guitar parts were performed by Duke Erikson, also of Garbage. Other official single remixes include Brian Eno's "Apex" mix, which sounds closer to the album version, and "The Jeep Rock" mix, produced by Jonny Dollar and Portishead, which appears on Remixes 81–04.

During concerts in 1993 and 1994, the album version was played live. From the 1998 Singles Tour onwards, the Zephyr mix of the song has been played live instead. However, during the 2009 Tour of the Universe', a mixture of both versions was played live. During the "Global Spirit Tour" the band returned to the album version again.

The single was released in a special foldout digipak with room to hold three different versions of the "In Your Room" single: the original release (CDBong24), a live disc (LCDBong24) and a remix disc (XLCDBong24). The b-sides consist of a remix of album track "Higher Love", along with some live songs from the Devotional Tour.

Depeche Mode's first appearance on the "Late Show with David Letterman", filmed during a stop on their "The Singles Tour", featured an abbreviated version of  "In Your Room."

Critical reception
Larry Flick from Billboard wrote that the song "sees the band move further into dance-rock territory." He added, "Typically haunting vocals and intense lyrics are enhanced by rugged beats and a quasi-industrial guitar sound that will ring true in the hearts of alternative DJs." Martin Aston from Music Week gave it five out of five. Another editor, Alan Jones, named it Pick of the Week, saying, "Less obviously a rock record than some of their recent releases, the new Depeche Mode single is a fairly dark but nonethe less quite commercial record in which some dense guitar work is punctuated by a pleasant chorus." Sam Wood from Philadelphia Inquirer found that it "seem to be about divine visitation."

Music video
The accompanying music video for "In Your Room" (using the Zephyr mix) was directed by Anton Corbijn and features references to the videos for "Strangelove" (a model posing in her underwear), "I Feel You" (a woman dressed as Dave Gahan, wearing a pinstripe suit, sunglasses, and a wig), "Walking in My Shoes" (the bird costume), "Halo" (the people wearing clown makeup), "Enjoy the Silence" (a woman dressed as a king, holding the folding chair while walking in the road), "Personal Jesus" (a woman wearing a cowboy hat like the band members did), "Condemnation" (the white dress with ribbons on it that one of the women wears) and "Never Let Me Down Again" (tea drinking). Corbijn described the video as a retrospective of the work he had done with Depeche Mode. He said he made it that way because he wasn't sure if he was going to do another Depeche Mode video after it. He later elaborated stating, that this video was made during the rise of band troubles and of Dave Gahan's drug addiction so it was uncertain whether the band would still exist for another video to be made.

The video features Alexandra Kummer, who sometimes is partially clothed. Because of the partial nudity and scenes of bondage, the video only aired after prime time on MTV in the US.

Track listings
All songs were written by Martin Gore.

 UK and Australian CD1
 "In Your Room" (Zephyr mix)
 "In Your Room" (extended Zephyr mix)
 "Never Let Me Down Again"
 "Death's Door"

 UK and Australian CD2
 "In Your Room"
 "Policy of Truth"
 "World in My Eyes"
 "Fly on the Windscreen"

 UK and Australian CD3
 "In Your Room" (The Jeep Rock mix)
 "In Your Room" (Apex mix)
 "Higher Love" (Adrenaline mix)

 UK and Australian cassette single
 "In Your Room" (Zephyr mix)
 "Higher Love" (Adrenaline mix)

 UK 12-inch single 1
A1. "In Your Room" (Zephyr mix)
A2. "In Your Room" (Apex mix)
A3. "In Your Room" (The Jeep Rock mix)
B1. "Higher Love" (Adrenaline mix)
B2. "In Your Room" (extended Zephyr mix)

 UK 12-inch single 2
A1. "In Your Room"
A2. "Policy of Truth"
A3. "World in My Eyes"
B1. "Fly on the Windscreen"
B2. "Never Let Me Down Again"
B3. "Death's Door"

 US 12-inch and cassette single
A1. "In Your Room" (extended Zephyr mix) – 6:43
A2. "In Your Room" (Apex mix) – 6:43
B1. "In Your Room" (The Jeep Rock mix) – 6:19
B2. "Higher Love" (Adrenaline mix) – 7:49

 US CD single
 "In Your Room" (Zephyr mix)
 "In Your Room" (extended Zephyr mix)
 "Higher Love" (Adrenaline mix)
 "In Your Room" (The Jeep Rock mix)
 "Policy of Truth" (live)
 "In Your Room" (Apex mix)
 "In Your Room" (live)
 All live tracks were recorded in Lievin, France, on 29 July 1993.

Charts

Weekly charts

Year-end charts

Notable cover versions
 Fallon Bowman's band, Amphibious Assault, covered the song for their debut LP District Six in 2003.

References

External links
 Single information from the official Depeche Mode web site
 [ Allmusic song review]
 [ Allmusic US CD single review]  

1993 songs
1994 singles
Depeche Mode songs
Music videos directed by Anton Corbijn
Mute Records singles
Song recordings produced by Flood (producer)
Songs written by Martin Gore
UK Independent Singles Chart number-one singles